Clovis is the modern conventional French (and thence English) form of the Old Frankish name  (in runic alphabet) or *"Hlōdowik" or "Hlōdowig" (in Latin alphabet), equivalent to the modern forms Louis (French), Lodewijk (Dutch), Lewis (English), and Ludwig (German).

Etymology
The name *Hlōdowik or *Hlōdowig is traditionally considered to be composed of two elements, deriving from both Proto-Germanic *hlūdaz ("loud, famous") and *wiganą ("to battle, to fight") respectively, resulting in the traditional practice of translating Clovis' name as meaning "famous warrior".

However, scholars have pointed out that Gregory of Tours consequently transcribes the names of various Merovingian royal names containing the first element as chlodo-. The use of a close-mid back protruded vowel (o), rather than the expected close back rounded vowel (u) which Gregory does use in various other Germanic names (i.e. Fredegundis, Arnulfus, Gundobadus, etc.) opens up the possibility that the first element instead derives from Proto-Germanic *hlutą ("lot, share, portion"), giving the meaning of the name as "loot bringer" or "plunder (bringing) warrior". This hypothesis is supported by the fact that if the first element is taken to mean "famous", then the name of Chlodomer (one of Clovis' sons) would contain two elements (*hlūdaz and *mērijaz) both meaning "famous", which would be highly uncommon within the typical Germanic name structure.

Frankish royalty
 Clovis I (c. 466 – 511), the first king of the Franks to unite all the Frankish tribes under one ruler
 Clovis II (637 – c. 658), king of Neustria and Burgundy
 Clovis III (reigned 675–676), the king of Austrasia
 Clovis IV (682–695), the sole king of the Franks from 691 until 695
 Clovis (died 580), son of Chilperic I and Audovera, assassinated by his father and stepmother
 Louis the Pious, son of Charlemagne, King of Aquitaine from 781 and sole ruler of the Franks 814–840, but counted as "Louis I of France" even though West Francia (the nucleus of the later kingdom of France) was formed only after his death.

Modern use
Because of the importance of Clovis I in the national historiography of France, the form Clovis has been occasionally revived beginning in the 19th century. In the same period,  the form Chlodwig has seen some limited use in Germany.

 Chlodwig, Prince of Hohenlohe-Schillingsfürst (1819–1901)
 Clovis Hugues (1851–1907), French author
 Chlodwig, Landgrave of Hesse-Philippsthal-Barchfeld (1876–1954)
 Clovis Trouille (1889–1975), French painter
 Clovis-Thomas Richard (1892–1976), Canadian politician
 Clovis Renaison (1892–1989), French Senator
 Clovis E. Byers (1899–1979), American general
 Clovis Cornillac (b. 1967),  French actor
 Clovis Kamdjo (b. 1990), Cameroonian footballer

Fictional characters
 Clovis la Britannia, a character in the anime series Code Geass
 Clovis, the main antagonist in the 1997 Blade Runner video game
 Clovis Sangrail, a character in the short stories of Saki
 Clovis, a minor character in Rick Riordan's Heroes of Olympus series.
 Clovis, a major supporting character in Keith Knight's Woke series.
 Rush Clovis, supporting character in the Star Wars Universe who appears in Star Wars: The Clone Wars.
 Clovis Bray, a character appearing in the lore of the games Destiny and Destiny 2 and later revealed as a character in Destiny 2: Beyond Light.

See also
 Clovis (disambiguation)

References

French masculine given names